Poa flabellata, commonly known as tussac grass or just tussac, is a tussock grass native to southern South America, the Falkland Islands, South Georgia and other islands in the South Atlantic. There are also two isolated records from the herbarium at the French Muséum national d'histoire naturelle for the Île Amsterdam in the Indian Ocean.

It was introduced to Shetland, Scotland for basket making in 1844, and possibly as a source of fodder because of its ability to grow in hostile conditions..

Associated organisms 

The plant community dominated by P. flabellata is widely used by birds and mammals.

Breeding colonies of southern fur seal, elephant seal, Magellanic penguin, macaroni penguin, and albatrosses are all found amongst tussac grass on South Georgia and elsewhere. The austral thrush is predominantly found in this habitat on the Falkland Islands, with tussocks being used as nesting sites. The South Georgia pipit also uses the tussocks for nesting.

On South Georgia, it was a principal food of the introduced reindeer (which was eradicated in 2015) which had caused considerable environmental damage, including erosion and eventual replacement of tussac grass in places by the introduced annual meadow-grass.

References

Bibliography
 
 
 
 
 Marticorena, C. & M. Quezada (1985). Catálogo de la Flora Vascular de Chile. Gayana, Bot. 42: 1–157.
 
 Moore, D. M. (1968). The vascular flora of the Falkland Islands. British Antarctic Survey Scientific Reports. 60: 1–202, 1–6 pls.
 Nicora, E. G., M. E. D. Paula, A. M. Faggi, M. d. Mariano, A. M. M. A., L. R. Parodi, C. A. Petetin, F. A. Roig & Z. R. Agrasar (1978). Gramineae. 8(3): 1–583. In M. N. Correa Fl. Patagónica. Instituto Nacional de Tecnología Agropecuaria, Buenos Aires.
 Scott, W. & Palmer R. (1987). The Flowering Plants and Ferns of the Shetland Islands. Shetland Times, Lerwick.
 
 Soreng, R. J., G. Davidse, P. M. Peterson, F. O. Zuloaga, E. J. Judziewicz, T. S. Filgueiras & O. Morrone (2003- ). On-line taxonomic novelties and updates, distributional additions and corrections, and editorial changes since the four published volumes of the Catalogue of New World Grasses (Poaceae) published in Contr. U.S. Natl. Herb. vols. 39, 41, 46, and 48. http://www.tropicos.org/Project/CNWG:. In R. J. Soreng, G. Davidse, P. M. Peterson, F. O. Zuloaga, T. S. Filgueiras, E. J. Judziewicz & O. Morrone Internet Catalogue. New World Grasses. Missouri Botanical Garden, St. Louis.    
 Soreng, R. J., L. M. Giussani & M. A. Negritto (2003). "Poa". In Catalogue of New World Grasses (Poaceae): IV. Subfamily Pooideae. Contr. U.S. Natl. Herb. 48: 505–580.  
 
 
 
 Zuloaga, F. O., E. G. Nicora, Z. E. R. Agrasar, O. Morrone, J. Pensiero & A. M. Cialdella (1994). Catálogo de la familia Poaceae en la República Argentina. Monographs in Systematic Botany from the Missouri Botanical Garden. 47: i–xi, 1–178.
 Zuloaga, F. O., O. Morrone, M. J. Belgrano, C. Marticorena & E. Marchesi (eds.) (2008). Catálogo de las Plantas Vasculares del Cono Sur (Argentina, Sur de Brasil, Chile, Paraguay y Uruguay). Monographs in Systematic Botany from the Missouri Botanical Garden. 107(1): i–xcvi, 1–983; 107(2): i–xx, 985–2286; 107(3): i–xxi, 2287–3348.

flabellata
Flora of southern Chile
Flora of South Argentina
Flora of South Georgia Island
Flora of Gough Island
Flora of the Falkland Islands